Anton "Toni" Kehle (8 November 1947 in Füssen – 24 September 1997) was a German ice hockey goaltender who played for the West German national team. He won a bronze medal at the 1976 Winter Olympics.

References

External links
 
 
 
 

1947 births
1997 deaths
EV Füssen players
Ice hockey players at the 1972 Winter Olympics
Ice hockey players at the 1976 Winter Olympics
Olympic bronze medalists for West Germany
Olympic ice hockey players of West Germany
Olympic medalists in ice hockey
Sportspeople from Füssen
Medalists at the 1976 Winter Olympics
West German ice hockey goaltenders